Michelin Polska (till 2005 named Stomil Olsztyn) is a tyre manufacturer based in Olsztyn, Poland. The company came into existence when the tyre plant OZOS „Stomil”, founded in 1967, was privatized in 1992. In 1995, Michelin acquired the majority share in Stomil. From 1995 to May 28, 2004, Stomil was quoted at the Warsaw Stock Exchange. In 2005, Polska gained full control of Stomil and renamed it to 'Michelin Polska S.A.'. With roughly 4,000 employees Michelin Polska is one of the largest Michelin plants and the largest tyre plant in Poland.

References

Olsztyn
Automotive companies established in 1992
Tire manufacturers
Companies formerly listed on the Warsaw Stock Exchange
Polish companies established in 1992
Michelin